Mount Russell is a peak in the Sierra Nevada mountain range in the U.S. state of California, about  north of Mount Whitney.  With an elevation of  it is the seventh-highest peak in the state.

Geography 
Mount Russell is located on the Sierra Crest, which in this area marks the boundary between the John Muir Wilderness, the Inyo National Forest and Sequoia National Park; and the boundary between Inyo County and Tulare County. It rises just southwest of Tulainyo Lake, one of the highest and largest of the high alpine lakes of the southern Sierra.

History 
The peak was named for Israel Cook Russell, an American geologist who was a member of the Wheeler Survey and who was best known for his explorations in Alaska.

Climbing 
The first ascent of Mount Russell was on June 24, 1926, by famed Sierra mountaineer Norman Clyde. It offers climbers at least a dozen routes, from multiple scrambling routes (class 3) to a serious technical route (Grade IV, 5.10).

Mount Russell sees far less traffic than its much more famous neighbor Mount Whitney. However, since its southern and eastern slopes fall in the Mount Whitney Zone of the Inyo National Forest, these approaches are governed by stricter access limits. From May to October, only ten people per day are permitted to enter the North Fork of Lone Pine Creek for overnight use. Day-use climbers are grouped with the Whitney Main Trail day-use quota.  This puts climbers on Russell's most common approaches in competition with climbers on Whitney's popular Mountaineer's Route, and also with the Main Trail users.

See also
 List of California fourteeners
 Mount Randy Morgenson

References

External links
 

Fourteeners of California
Mountains of Sequoia National Park
Mountains of the John Muir Wilderness
Mountains of Inyo County, California
Mountains of Tulare County, California
Mountains of Northern California